This is a list of recipients of the Professional Footballers' Association Scotland (PFA Scotland) Player's Player of the Year award for each of the three divisions (the Scottish Championship, Scottish League One and Scottish League Two), below the top division (the Scottish Premiership). Each is an annual award given to the player who is adjudged to have been the best of the season in Scottish football.  The winner is chosen by a vote amongst the members of the players' trade union, the Professional Footballers' Association Scotland (PFA Scotland).

The award was formerly known as the Scottish Professional Footballers' Association Players' Player of the Year, but was renamed after the SPFA merged with the (English) Professional Footballers' Association to become PFA Scotland. In 2007 the SPFA was replaced by a new body, PFA Scotland, but the new organisation's awards are considered to be a direct continuation of the SPFA awards. A shortlist of nominees is published in April and the winner of the award, along with the winners of PFA Scotland's other annual awards, is announced at a gala event in Glasgow a few days later.

Winners

Other awards

Women

Other

Notes

References

Scottish football trophies and awards
Footballers in Scotland
Annual events in Scotland
Annual sporting events in the United Kingdom
Scotland
Association football player non-biographical articles